WADS, the Algorithms and Data Structures Symposium, is an international academic conference in the field of computer science, focusing on algorithms and data structures. WADS is held every second year, usually in Canada and always in North America. It is held in alternation with its sister conference, the Scandinavian Symposium and Workshops on Algorithm Theory (SWAT), which is usually held in Scandinavia and always in Northern Europe. Historically, the proceedings of both conferences were published by Springer Verlag through their Lecture Notes in Computer Science series. Springer continues to publish WADS proceedings, but starting in 2016, SWAT proceedings are now published by Dagstuhl through their Leibniz International Proceedings in Informatics.

History
The first SWAT took place in 1988, in Halmstad, Sweden. The first WADS was organised one year later, in 1989, in Ottawa, Ontario, Canada. Until 2007, WADS was known as the Workshop on Algorithms and Data Structures, and until 2008, SWAT was known as the Scandinavian Workshop on Algorithm Theory.

See also
 The list of computer science conferences contains other academic conferences in computer science.

Notes

References
 . Also available as a Princeton University technical report TR-521-96. Section 13.2 mentions the following conferences (in this order) as examples of "major algorithms conferences" with "a large amount of geometry": SODA, ISAAC, ESA, WADS, SWAT.
 . Section 7.3.2 mentions the following conferences (in this order) as examples of conferences that publish articles on pattern matching (in addition to more narrow conferences CPM, COCOON, RECOMB, SPIRE, ISMB): DCC, ESA, FOCS, FSTTCS, ICALP, ISAAC, MFCS, SODA, STACS, STOC, SWAT, WAE, WADS.
 The 2007 Australian Ranking of ICT Conferences. Conferences on tier A ("... would add to the author's respect...") include SWAT and WADS.

External links
Bibliographic information about SWAT at DBLP
Bibliographic information about WADS at DBLP

Theoretical computer science conferences